The Sydney University Evangelical Union (abbreviated to SUEU or simply the EU) is a student-led Christian group that has operated at the University of Sydney since 1930. It is affiliated with the Australian Fellowship of Evangelical Students (AFES) and the International Fellowship of Evangelical Students. The EU has throughout its history maintained a relationship with St Barnabas Anglican Church in Broadway and the Sydney Anglican culture in general whilst retaining a non-denominational base. The EU is also quite unique amongst its contemporary AFES affiliates in having a student-staff partnership, in contrast to other groups (such as Campus Bible Study at the University of New South Wales) which has maintained a staff-run model.

In 2002, the publication by the Union of a statement during their on-campus mission, "absoluteGod", encouraging students to investigate Christianity, was signed by 22 senior academics at the university and worried many for allegedly damaging the religious and racial tolerance at the university.

Description

The Sydney University Evangelical Union is a registered student society of the University of Sydney, comprising an estimated 600 Christian students, making it one of the largest registered clubs and societies of the Sydney University Union. It is led by an elected student executive consisting of a president, male and female vice-presidents, a secretary and treasurer. They are elected annually at the September AGM.

The EU is governed by the General Council, which consists of representatives from the executive, faculty leadership (who in turn lead committees to run ministry within their faculty) and wider EU membership; the latter of which are often appointed by the General Council to lead a specialist team responsible for the organisation of things such as Public Meetings, Annual Conference, IT and Training.

Activities include sermons in Public Meetings, faculty based small group bible studies, prayer meetings, several conferences including Annual Conference and Leadership Summit, along with mission trips.  These activities are organized by specialist teams consisting of students and staff, led by a student appointed by the General Council. The EU regularly runs events designed to present students with the Christian Gospel, per the objectives of the EU, and to attract new members; for example, in 2008 the EU hosted a campus-wide festival, with scores of events taking place throughout the university

Notable people

Former members of the EU:
Peter Jensen
Phillip Jensen
Sir Marcus Loane
Catherine Hamlin
 Robert Forsyth 
 Bruce Baird
 Mike Baird

History
A history of the EU's first 75 years (1930-2005) was published in 2005. It is written by Meredith Lake, EU Vice-President 2002–03. A further history is also available on the EU website.

References

Further reading
Lake, Meredith (2005), Proclaiming Jesus Christ as Lord. The EU: Sydney. 
Prince, John and Moyra (1987), Out of the Tower. ANZEA: Sydney.

External links
 EU website
 Australian Fellowship of Evangelical Students

Student societies in Australia
Evangelical parachurch organizations
Christian organisations based in Australia
1930 establishments in Australia
University of Sydney
Christian organizations established in 1930